"The Night" is a song by German hard dance band Scooter. It heavily interpolates "The Night" by Valerie Dore. The song was released as the second single from Scooter's ninth studio album, The Stadium Techno Experience, on 26 May 2003. Upon its release, "The Night" reached number eight in Hungary, number 10 in Germany, and reached the top 20 in Austria, Denmark, Finland, Sweden, and the United Kingdom.

Track listings

German maxi-CD single
 "The Night" (radio edit) – 3:24
 "The Night" (club mix) – 5:52
 "The Night" (Starsplash remix) – 3:54
 "The Night" (Langenhagen remix) – 6:02
 "Cordyline" – 3:46
 Scooter media navigator

European CD single
 "The Night" (radio edit) – 3:24
 "The Night" (extended) – 4:57

European 12-inch single
 "The Night" (club mix) – 5:47
 "The Night" (extended) – 4:57
 "The Night" (Starsplash remix) – 6:09
 "The Night" (Langenhagen remix) – 7:05

UK cassette single
 "The Night" (radio edit) – 3:22
 "The Night" (LMC remix) – 4:47

UK CD single
 "The Night" (radio edit) – 3:22
 "The Night" (LMC mix) – 4:47
 "The Night" (Almighty mix) – 7:10
 "The Night" (video)

UK 12-inch single
 "The Night" (LMC remix) – 4:47
 "The Night" (Almighty remix) – 7:10
 "The Night" (Starsplash remix) – 6:09

Australian CD single
 "The Night" (radio edit) – 3:24
 "The Night" (club mix) – 5:52
 "The Night" (Starsplash remix) – 3:54
 "The Night" (Langenhagen remix) – 6:02
 "Cordyline" – 3:46

Charts

Release history

References

2003 singles
2003 songs
Scooter (band) songs
Songs written by H.P. Baxxter
Songs written by Jens Thele
Songs written by Rick J. Jordan